Informulary is a health research and information company.

Informulary publishes drug fact boxes. Consumers are one of the target audiences for these fact boxes. The organization assumes that consumer choice is important in deciding when to take drugs.

Inforumulary was founded by Lisa Schwartz and Steven Woloshin, who are both professors at The Dartmouth Institute for Health Policy and Clinical Practice.

Woloshin and Schwartz have been criticized for their complaints about weight loss drugs. Through Informulary, Woloshin and Schwartz have criticized antidepressant use.

References

External links

Dartmouth College
Geisel School of Medicine